Carolyn Ansari (born 29 December 2000) is an American tennis player.

Ansari has a career-high singles ranking by the Women's Tennis Association (WTA) of 1100, achieved on 23 May 2022. She also has a career-high doubles ranking by the WTA of 638, achieved on 23 May 2022.

Ansari won the biggest title of her career-to-date at the 2022 Pelham Racquet Club Pro Classic, where she won the doubles title partnering Ariana Arseneault.

Ansari attends college at Auburn University.

ITF Circuit finals

Singles: 1 (runner-up)

Doubles: 2 (1 title, 1 runner-up)

Notes

References

External links
 
 
 Carolyn Ansari at the Auburn University

2000 births
Living people
American female tennis players
Auburn Tigers women's tennis players
Sportspeople from Greensboro, North Carolina
Tennis people from North Carolina